Dimeragrion is a genus of flatwings in the damselfly suborder Zygoptera, family Heteragrionidae. There are five described species in Dimeragrion.

Species
 Dimeragrion clavijoi De Marmels, 1999
 Dimeragrion mesembrium De Marmels, 1989
 Dimeragrion percubitale Calvert, 1913
 Dimeragrion secundum Needham, 1933
 Dimeragrion unturanense De Marmels, 1992

References

Calopterygoidea